The National Army of Montenegro and Herzegovina was a military unit established by Colonel Bajo Stanišić in February 1942. It was composed of six battalions, some of them being Chetniks, with Stanišić being its commander.

References 

Military units and formations of Yugoslavia in World War II
Military units and formations established in 1942
Montenegro in World War II